Ballıkaya can refer to:

 Ballıkaya, Bayburt
 Ballıkaya, Karacabey